Maraga (Marağa) is a rural locality (a selo) and the administrative centre of  Maraginsky Selsoviet, Tabasaransky District, Republic of Dagestan, Russia. The population was 1,791 as of 2010. There are 3 streets.

Geography 
Maraga is located 22 km east of Khuchni (the district's administrative centre) by road. Gelinbatan is the nearest rural locality.

References 

Rural localities in Tabasaransky District